Kurmanayevo (Qormanay; , Törgymtür) is a rural locality (a village) in Bolshesukhoyazovsky Selsoviet, Mishkinsky District, Bashkortostan, Russia. The population was 428 as of 2010. There are 14 streets.

Geography 
Kurmanayevo is located 39 km northwest of Mishkino (the district's administrative centre) by road. Bolshesukhoyazovo is the nearest rural locality.

References 

Rural localities in Mishkinsky District